Tuppen is a 1981 Swedish film directed by Lasse Hallström.

Cast
Magnus Härenstam - Cederqvist
Lill-Anna Andersson - Lisa
Ellionor Bille- Barbro Karlsson
Åsa Bjerkerot - Gerda Skogsberg
Ing-Marie Carlsson - Karin Petrén 
Annika Christensen - Bodil
Annika Dopping - Magda Fors
Suzanne Ernrup - Ottilia
Maria Johansson - Hjördis Nilsson
Ebba Malmström - Cecilia
Pernilla August - Åsa Eriksson 
Allan Edwall - Thorsson
Lena Brogren - Old Lady
Lars Göran Carlson - Disponent 
Anita Ekström - Anna
Irma Erixson - Old Lady

External links
 

1981 films
Films directed by Lasse Hallström
Swedish romantic comedy films
1980s Swedish-language films
1980s Swedish films